Tribal Voice is the second studio album by Yothu Yindi, released in September 1991 on the Mushroom Records label. The album peaked at number 4 on the ARIA Charts and was certified 2× Platinum.

At the 1992 ARIA Awards Yothu Yindi won ARIA Award for Best Cover Art for Tribal Voice by Louise Beach and Mushroom Art with photography by Serge Thomann; ARIA Award for Engineer of the Year for "Maralitja", "Dharpa" and "Tribal Voice" by David Price, Ted Howard, Greg Henderson and Simon Polinski; ARIA Award for Best Indigenous Release for Tribal Voice; ARIA Award for Song of the Year and Single for the Year for "Treaty".

The album did not receive a domestic vinyl release until 2018, however it was released on vinyl in Europe in 1992.

Reception

AllMusic's reviewer, Jonathon Lewis commented "the traditional songs are stunning, and Mandawuy Yunupingu's voice is suited perfectly to these, but it is the rock tracks that are the weak links in this disc. Yunupingu is not a particularly good pop singer, and the music is sometimes insipid" but went on to say "despite this, Tribal Voice is a fine example of both traditional and modern Aboriginal music."

Track listing
"Gapu" (Traditional song, arranged by Galarrwuy Yunupingu)
"Treaty" (Mandawuy Yunupingu, G. Yunupingu, Milkayngu Mununggurr, Witiyana Marika, Stuart Kellaway, Cal Williams, Paul Kelly)
"Djäpana (Sunset Dreaming)" (M. Yunupingu)
"My Kind of Life" (M. Yunupingu)
"Maralitja" (Crocodile Man) (M. Yunupingu)
"Dhum Dhum" (Bush Wallaby) (Traditional song, arranged by Marika)
"Tribal Voice" (M. Yunupingu)
"Mainstream" (M. Yunupingu)
"Dharpa" (Tree) (M. Yunupingu, Kellaway)
"Yinydjapana" (Dolphin) (Traditional song, arranged by Marika)
"Mätjala" (Driftwood) (M. Yunupingu, G. Yunupingu, Marika, Kellaway, Williams)
"Hope" (M. Yunupingu)
"Gapirri" (Stingray) (M. Yunupingu)
"Beyarrmak" (Comic) (Traditional song, arranged by G. Yunupingu)
"Treaty" (Radio Mix) (M. Yunupingu, G. Yunupingu, Mununggurr, Marika, Kellaway, Williams, Kelly, Garrett) (moved to after "Tribal Voice" on 2018 LP reissue)
"Djäpana" (Radio Mix) (M. Yunupingu)

Tracks 3, 8 and 16 were added to the 1992 reissue of the album and appear on all subsequent reissues. Tracks 3, 6 and 16 were released as a CD single in 1992 and tracks 3 and 8 appear (in different versions) on the band's 1989 debut Homeland Movement.

Track 2 appears in the 1992 film Encino Man.

Personnel
Mandawuy Yunupingu – lead vocals, backing vocals, guitar
Galarrwuy Yunupingu – vocals, clapsticks
Witiyana Marika – vocals, clapsticks, backing vocals
Milkayngu Mununggurr – didgeridoo, backing vocals
Gurrumul Yunupingu – keyboards, percussion, guitar, didgeridoo, organ, backing vocals
Makuma Yunupingu – didgeridoo
Cal Williams – lead guitar, rhythm guitar, guitar, backing vocals
Stuart Kellaway – bass guitar, backing vocals
Ricki Fataar – drums, percussion, backing vocals
Mark Moffatt – organ, bass guitar, guitar
Ray Periera – congas
Allen Murphy – drums
Huey Benjamin – drums
Archie Roach – backing vocals
Tim Finn – backing vocals
Rose Bygrave – backing vocals
Steve Wade – backing vocals

Charts

Weekly charts

Year-end charts

Certifications

References

ARIA Award-winning albums
Yothu Yindi albums
Mushroom Records albums
1991 albums